Uni.T (stylized as UNI.T) was a South Korean girl group formed through the KBS survival show The Unit. The group consisted of nine members: Yang Ji-won, Bae Woo-hee, Yoonjo, ZN, NC.A, Euijin, Yebin, Lee Hyun-joo and Lee Su-ji. For their second and last release, they were promoting as 8 without ZN. Their debut extended play, Line, was released on May 18, 2018., Uni.T ended their activities and disbanded on October 12, 2018.

History

Pre-debut: The Unit

Members' history
Prior to The Unit, all the members were actively involved in the entertainment industry:
 Yang Ji-won was originally part of the pre-debut lineups of Five Girls and T-ara, but later left and debuted as a member of Spica in February 2012, the group subsequently went on a hiatus in June 2017.
 Yoonjo debuted as a member of Hello Venus in May 2012, but left in July 2014 due to changes in management.
 Woohee was added to Dal Shabet as a member in June 2012.
 NC.A debuted as a solo artist in August 2013.
 ZN debuted as a member of Laboum in August 2014.
 Euijin debuted as a member of Sonamoo in December 2014.
 Lee Su-ji debuted as a member of The Ark in April 2015, the group later on disbanded in 2016 and she went on to debut as a member of Real Girls Project in August 2016.
 Lee Hyun-joo debuted as a member of April in August 2015, but left in October 2016 to pursue an acting career.
 Yebin debuted as a member of DIA in September 2015.

Formation through The Unit

In July 2017, KBS announced their new survival show that would create male and female unit groups, with nine members each, among idols who had already debuted. The program aimed to give them a fair chance to demonstrate their talents that they might not have been able to showcase before. The final nine female contestants were chosen by public voting and announced via live television broadcast. It premiered on October 28, 2017, and concluded on February 10, 2018.

On February 21, 2018, it was revealed that the female group, Uni+ G, would hold their first fan-meeting on March 3 at Blue Square iMarket Hall. The tickets sold out within two hours of being on sale. On February 24's broadcast of The Unit's Special Show, the final nine female contestants that formed “Uni+ G” became UNI.T following the announcement.

On April 28, 2018, it was revealed that UNI.T would make their debut on May 17, 2018. However, on May 11, their debut was pushed back to May 18, a day after their initial debut date.

Debut with Line

UNI.T  debuted with their first extended play, Line, on May 18, 2018, with the lead single "No More", composed by Shinsadong Tiger. The lead single is characterized by its reggae elements. The group performed "No More" for the first time at the 2018 Dream Concert on May 12, six days before their debut. They made their debut stage on KBS' Music Bank on the same day as the album's release, where they performed "A Memory Clock" and "No More".

Last activities and disbandment
Uni.T released its second and last album titled Begin with the End on September 18, 2018, with the lead single "I Mean" being composed by Brave Brothers. On September 12, 2018, it was announced that ZN would not be a part of the farewell album due to Laboum's overlapped schedule.

On October 12, 2018, the group performed "I Mean" and "Begin with the End" for the last time on Music Bank and later the same day held their last fan meeting, after which they disbanded.

Members
Adapted from The Unit official website:
 Yang Ji-won (former Spica)
 Woohee (Dal Shabet) – Leader
 Yoonjo (former Hello Venus)
 ZN (Laboum)
 NC.A
 Euijin (Sonamoo)
 Yebin (DIA)
 Lee Hyun-joo (former April)
 Lee Su-ji (former The Ark)

Discography

Extended plays

Singles

Filmography

Reality shows
 The Unit (KBS2, 2017–2018)
 UNI.TV (2018)

Awards and nominations

Golden Disc Awards

References

K-pop music groups
MBK Entertainment artists
2018 establishments in South Korea
Musical groups established in 2018
Musical groups from Seoul
South Korean girl groups
South Korean dance music groups
South Korean pop music groups